Nikola Ilich (born March 13, 1992) is an American soccer player who last played as a midfielder for Orange County Blues FC in the United Soccer League.

Career

Youth and college
Ilich played two years of college soccer at Vanguard University.

Professional
After spending time on trial with clubs in Europe, Ilich went on trial with United Soccer League club Orange County Blues and signed with the club on April 2, 2015.

References

1992 births
Living people
American soccer players
Orange County SC players
Association football midfielders
Soccer players from California
USL Championship players